Mark Andrew Thomas (born May 6, 1969) is a former American football defensive end who played ten seasons in the National Football League for the San Francisco 49ers, the Carolina Panthers, the Chicago Bears, and the Indianapolis Colts. He played college football at North Carolina State University and was selected in the fourth round of the 1992 NFL Draft. Married to Christina Thomas and has 4 children named Caleb Thomas, Katelyn Thomas, Naomi Thomas, and Jude Thomas.

References

External links 
NFL.com player page

1969 births
Living people
People from Lilburn, Georgia
Sportspeople from the Atlanta metropolitan area
Players of American football from Georgia (U.S. state)
American football defensive ends
NC State Wolfpack football players
San Francisco 49ers players
Carolina Panthers players
Chicago Bears players
Indianapolis Colts players